
The following is a list of Playboy Playmates of 1967.  Playboy magazine names their Playmate of the Month each month throughout the year.

January

Surrey Marshe (born Solveig Mellomborgen; November 11, 1947) was Playboy magazine's Playmate of the Month for its January 1967 issue. Her centerfold was photographed by Alexas Urba.  As "Pat Fellowes", she also appeared as Penthouse's Pet of the Month for October 1969, as well as in other men's magazines of the time.

Mellomborgen wrote about her experiences as a playmate in a 1969 book, called The Girl In The Centerfold.

February

Kim Farber (born December 7, 1946) was Playboy magazine's Playmate of the Month for its February 1967 issue. Her centerfold was photographed by Stan Malinowski.

March

Fran Gerard (born Frances Anna Camuglia; March 23, 1948 – May 30, 1985) was Playboy magazine's Playmate of the Month for its March 1967 issue. Her centerfold was photographed by Mario Casilli and Gene Trindl.

April

Gwen Wong (born August 12, 1942) is a Filipino-American model and actress. She is
Eurasian, being a mixture of Chinese, Scottish, Spanish, Australian, Filipino and Irish. She was Playboy magazine's Playmate of the Month for its April 1967 issue. Her centerfold was photographed by Mario Casilli and Gene Trindl.

Wong worked as a Bunny at the Los Angeles Playboy Club, and later became an artist specializing in body casting and sculptural portraiture.

She appeared in one film, The Witchmaker (1969), playing the role of "Fong Qual".  Her film credit, Gwen Lipscomb, was the result of her first marriage.

May

Anne Randall (born Barbara Burrus; September 23, 1944) is an American model and actress. She was Playboy magazine's Playmate of the Month for its May 1967 issue. Her centerfold was photographed by Mario Casilli.

June

Joey Gibson (born August 11, 1945) was Playboy magazine's Playmate of the Month for its June 1967 issue. Her centerfold was photographed by Peter Gowland.

July

Heather Ryan (born March 18, 1947) was Playboy magazine's Playmate of the Month for its July 1967 issue. Her centerfold was photographed by William Figge and Ed DeLong.

Ryan went on to become a wildlife biologist.  She writes about scientific topics and leads ecotours.

August

DeDe Lind (born Diane Lind; April 15, 1947) was Playboy magazine's Playmate of the Month for its August 1967 issue. Her centerfold was photographed by Mario Casilli.

September

Angela Dorian (born Victoria Vetri; September 26, 1944) is an American model and actress. She was Playboy magazine's Playmate of the Month for its September 1967 issue and Playmate of the Year for 1968. Her centerfold was photographed by Carl Gunther.

October

Reagan Diana Wilson (born March 6, 1947) is an American model and actress.  She was Playboy magazine's Playmate of the Month for its October 1967 issue. Her centerfold was photographed by Ron Vogel. Wilson again posed nude for Playboy for the pictorial "Playmates Forever!" in December 1979.

November

Kaya Christian (born October 4, 1946) was Playboy magazine's Playmate of the Month for its November 1967 issue. Her centerfold was photographed by William Figge and Ed DeLong.

December

Lynn Winchell (born May 4, 1947) was Playboy magazine's Playmate of the Month for its December 1967 issue. Her centerfold was photographed by William Figge and Ed DeLong.

See also
 List of people in Playboy 1960–1969

References

1967-related lists
1967
Playmates Of 1967